Dimas Arika Mihardja (July 3, 1959 in Yogyakarta – April 5, 2018 in Kotabaru, Jambi) was an Indonesian poet and scholar, essayist. He wrote under a pseudonym, the real name is Sudaryono. Among friends he was called as Dam.

Brief biography 
He graduated from a secondary school with a humanitarian specialization (SNAS) and the Pedagogical Institute "Sanat Dharma" in Yogyakarta. In 1985, he moved to Jambi, where since 1986, he began teaching Indonesian literature and culture at the Jambi University. In 2002, he defended his doctoral dissertation at the State University of Malang.  He died of kidney failure.

Creativity
He was actively engaged in poetic activity since the 1980s. He is considered to be one of the brightest representatives of the Generation 2000 in the Indonesian literature, who made a significant contribution to the development of the Indonesian vers libre. He regularly conducted poetry workshops which were very popular among other poets.

His poetry is characterized by imagery and an abundance of original metaphors.

The main works

Poetry collections 
 Sang Guru Sejati (Bengkel Puisi Swadaya Mandiri) (1991)
 Malin Kundang (Bengkel Puisi Swadaya Mandiri) (1993)
 Upacara Gerimis (Bengkel Puisi Swadaya Mandiri) (1994)
 Potret Diri (Bengkel Puisi Swadaya Mandiri) (1997)
 Ketika Jarum Jam Leleh dan Lelah Berdetak (Bengkel Puisi Swadaya Mandiri danTelanai Printing Graft) (2003).
 Koleksi puisi warga Bengkel Puisi Swadaya Mandiri (2012) 
 Nikah Kata-Kata: Antologi Puisi Karya Sarjana Media. Kuala Lumpur: Sarjana Media, 2013 (with Rohani Din)
 Beranda Senja: Setengah Abad Dimas Arika Mihardja. Jakarta: Kosa Kata Kita, 2010. 
 Sajak Emas: 200 Puisi Seksi. Jakarta: Kosa Kata Kita, 2010. 
 3 di Hati. Banda Aceh: Penerbit LAPENA, Institute for Culture and Society, 2010 (with Diah Hadaning and Deknong Kemalawati)

Other works 
 Catatan Harian Maya (novel, published in the newspaper ‘Independent’ – Jambi, 2002).
 Pasemon dalam Wacana Puisi Indonesia. Kelompok Studi Penulisan, 2003 (monograph on the basis of the dissertation)
 Resensi sastra (2015)  (a collection of critical articles)

Participation in anthologies with other authors 
 Riak-Riak Batang hari (Teater Bohemian, 1988)
 Percik Pesona 1 & 2 (Taman Budaya Jambi, 1992, 1993)
 Serambi 1, 2 & 3 (Teater Bohemian, 1992, 1993, 1994)
 Rendezvous (1993)
 Luka Liwa (1993)
 Pusaran Waktu (1994)
 Muaro (1995)
 Negeri Bayang-Bayang (1996)
 Mimbar Penyair Abad 21
 Antologi Puisi Indonesia (1997)
 Angkatan 2000 (2000)
 Angkatan 2000 dalam Sastra Indonesia. Jakarta: Gramedia, 2002
 Puisi Menolak Korupsi I (2013)
 Puisi Menolak Korupsi II (2014)
 Memo Untuk Presiden (2014)
 Dari Negeri Poci 5 (2014)

Translations into Russian 
 Three dimensions: heart (Tiga Dimensi: Hati); Three dimensions: earth, sea, sky (Tiga Dimensi: Bumi, Laut, Langit); The poem of tragedy (Puisi Tragedi).

Family 
 Wife Rita Indrawati, daughters: Marend Atika Mh., Riyandari Asrita Mh., Dyah Ayu Sukmawati.

References

See also
 Puisi Kopi Dimas Arika Mihardja 
 Sajak-sajak Dimas Arika Mihardja 
 Puisi-Puisi Dimas Arika Mihardja 

Indonesian culture
Indonesian literature
Javanese people
Indonesian male poets
1959 births
2018 deaths